The Mazurkas, Op. 6 contained four of the first mazurkas that Chopin published.

No. 1 in F minor
Dedicated to Grafin Pauline Plater, this mazurka uses Polish folk rhythms and modes and has a metronome mark of 132, making it one of Chopin's slower mazurkas. It is of moderate difficulty: the ABRSM system assigns a grade 7. The piece starts with a piano section in which the central theme is stated. This revolves around oscillating triplets and brings heavy accents on the third beat of each bar. A second theme, fortissimo, offers a passage full of sforzandos and wedge accents. The original theme then returns, forte, but quickly decrescendos. These passages end with repeats. The third theme enters as an ostinato under a thundering accompaniment with a grace note before every chord. There is use of the Lydian mode, and the accents are even heavier than in the second section. After several percussion chords, the central theme returns and the mazurka gradually dies away.

No. 2 in C minor

The second mazurka of the set, in C-sharp minor, is played faster than the previous one, with a more lively theme.

No. 3 in E major
The third mazurka of the set, in E major, features a happier theme than the rest, with a "waltz-esque" rhythm.

No. 4 in E minor
The final mazurka in E-flat minor is the shortest one of the set. The mazurka features a repeating theme.

Bibliography
 Chopin Mazurkas, ABRSM, Edited by Thomas Fielden and Harold Craxton
 CHOPIN FRYDERYK - Mazurki (1) - z serii DZIEŁA WSZYSTKIE wyk. Henryk Sztompka; op.6 (fis-moll, cis-moll, E-dur, es-moll, C-dur) (PolishMusic.ca)

External links 
 

Mazurkas by Frédéric Chopin
Music with dedications